The University of the Fraser Valley (UFV), (formerly known as University College of the Fraser Valley and Fraser Valley College) is a Canadian public university with campuses in Abbotsford, Chilliwack, Mission and Hope, British Columbia, as well as a presence in Chandigarh, India. The following is a list of faculties and schools at UFV.

Faculties and Schools

Faculty of Arts (website)
Arts
Department of Communications (website)
Department of Economics (website)
Department of English (website)
Department of Geography (website)
Department of History (website)
Modern Languages Institute (website)
Department of Philosophy (website)
Department of Political Science (website)
Department of Psychology (website)
Department of Social, Cultural and Media studies (website)
Department of Theatre (website)
Department of Visual Arts (website)
School of Criminology and Criminal Justice (website)
Faculty of Professional Studies (website)
Departments
Aviation (website)
Department of Business Administration (website)
Department of Early Childhood Education/Child & Youth Care (website)
Department of Applied Business Technology (website)
Department of Library and Information Technology (website)
School of Health Sciences (website)
School of Social Work and Human Services (website)
School of Computing (website)
Faculty of Science (website)
Department of Biology (website)
Department of Chemistry (website)
Engineering Transfer Program (website)
Department of Geography (website)
Department of Math and Statistics (website)
Department of Physics (website)
Faculty of Trades (website)
Department of Agriculture (website)
Department of Aircraft Structures (website)
Department of Architectural Drafting (website)
Department of Automotive Service 
Automotive Collision Repair (website)
Department of Carpentry (website)
Department of Culinary Arts (website)
Electrical (website)
Department of Electronics (website)
Heavy Duty/Commercial Transport (website)
Hospitality/Event Planning (website)
Joinery (website)
Plumbing and Piping (website)
Welding (website)
Faculty of Access and Continuing Studies (website)
 Faculty of Health Sciences (website)
 School of Health Studies (website)
 School of Kinesiology (website)
School of Graduate Studies (website)

References

External links
UFV Faculties and Programs
University of the Fraser Valley Official webpage
Student Union Society website

Faculties and schools
Nursing schools in Canada

no:University of the Fraser Valley